The De La Rose Stakes is an American Thoroughbred horse race run annually in late July/early August since 2004 at Saratoga Race Course in Saratoga Springs, New York. An ungraded stakes race, it is open to fillies and mares, 4-years-old and up. The race is run at a distance of one mile on the turf and offers a purse of $70,000 added.

It will be in its 8th running in 2011.

The De La Rose Stakes is named for the winner of the 1981 Diana Handicap, De La Rose, winner of the 1981 Eclipse Award for Outstanding Female Turf Horse

Past winners

 2022 – Our Flash Drive (Dylan Davis)
 2021 – Regal Glory (José Ortiz)
 2020 – Viadera (Joel Rosario)
 2019 – Got Stormy (Tyler Gaffalione)
 2018 – Uni (Irad Ortiz Jr.)
 2017 – Thundering Sky (Rajiv Maragh)
 2016 – Lady Lara (Jose Lezcano)
 2015 – Recepta (John Velazquez)
 2014 – Filimbi (Joel Rosario)
 2013 – Assateague (Luis Saez)
 2012 – Julie's Love (Julien Leparoux)
 2011 – Trix in the City (Shaun Bridgmohan)
 2010 – Miss Keller (Javier Castellano)
 2009 – Cocoa Beach (Ramon Domínguez)
 2008 – Carriage Trail (Edgar Prado)
 2007 – Fantastic Shirl (John Velazquez)
 2006 – Asi Siempre (4) (Julien Leparoux)
 2005-B – Cloak of Vagueness (5) (Edgar Prado)
 2005-A – Path of Thunder (4) (John Velazquez)
 2004-B – Fast Cookie (4) (Cornelio Velásquez)
 2004-A – Personal Legend (4) (Jerry Bailey)

External links
NYRA Saratoga Page

Mile category horse races for fillies and mares
Horse races in New York (state)
Turf races in the United States
Recurring events established in 2004
Saratoga Race Course
2004 establishments in New York (state)